Amor Prohibido (English Forbidden Love) is the second studio album by Mexican pop singer Daniela Romo. This album was released in 1984.

History
This album was produced by Danilo Vaona, it has the Spanish version hit "Yo no te pido la luna" (I don't ask you for the moon) of the Italian song "Non voglio mica la luna" by the singer Fiordaliso. It also includes the song "Ay, ay, ay" (Ouch, ouch, ouch) written by José Luis Perales and he participates in the background vocals, "Hoy te he visto en la terraza del bar" (Today I've seen you in the terrace of a bar) by José María Cano and "La fuerza de un hombre" (The strength of a man) by Gonzalo. All other tracks were written by Daniela and Danilo Vaona.

Track listing
Tracks:
 Yo no te pido la luna
 Ya no somos amantes
 Sola
 Amor Prohibido
 Una canción
 Jóvenes
 La fuerza de un hombre
 Solamente amigas
 Cadenas
 Enamorada de ti
 Ay, ay, ay
 Hoy te he visto en la terraza de un bar

Singles
 Yo no te pido la luna
 Ay, ay, ay
 Ya no somos amantes
 Enamorada de ti

1984 albums
Daniela Romo albums